In Aztec mythology, Tloquenahuaque, Tloque Nahuaque or Tloque Naoaque ("Lord of the Near and the Nigh") was one of the epithets of Tezcatlipoca. Miguel Leon Portilla argues that Tloque Nahuaque was also used as an epithet of Ometeotl, the hypothetical duality creator God of the Aztecs.

Alonso de Molina's Nahuatl-Spanish dictionary, published in 1571, defines "Tloque Nauaque" as, "next to whom is the being of all things, conserving them and sustaining them". The original Spanish is "cabe quien esta el ser de todas las cosas, conservándolas y sustentándolas".

References

Bibliography

Aztec gods
Creator gods